KNEK broadcasts at 1190 AM and is under ownership of Cumulus Media. It was a sister station of KNEK-FM until it was sold to The Last Bastion Station Trust, LLC upon merger of Citadel Broadcasting and ABC Radio. After Citadel swapped KRDJ with KNEK-FM, they are now sister stations again. Citadel merged with Cumulus Media on September 16, 2011. KNEK simulcasts sister station KNEK-FM, which broadcasts on the frequency of 104.7 FM. Its studios are located on Galbert Road in Lafayette, and its transmitter is located south of Washington, Louisiana.

KNEK started as a country and western station owned by Dee Sylvester and had a popular radio personality named Cholly Charles in the mid-1980s. The station aired from 6 am to sunset playing country music and broadcasting local news and sports along with agricultural updates for the farmers of St. Landry Parish.

Because it shares the same frequency as clear-channel AM Radio station XEWK-AM at Guadalajara, Jalisco in Mexico, this station only operates during the daytime hours.

References

External links

Darnell's Black Radio Guide - Louisiana Stations

Radio stations in Louisiana
Urban contemporary radio stations in the United States
Cumulus Media radio stations
Radio stations established in 1980
1980 establishments in Louisiana
Daytime-only radio stations in Louisiana